Old House and Essex Coach House are adjoining grade II listed buildings on The Green, Southgate, London.

See also
Arnoside House and Essex House

References

External links

Southgate, London
Houses in the London Borough of Enfield
Grade II listed buildings in the London Borough of Enfield
Grade II listed houses in London